Nadhi Karaiyinile is a 2003 Tamil language drama film, written and directed by Ponvannan. The film, which had an initial release at international film festivals with the title Jameela, stars Suvalakshmi, Rajan P. Dev and Ramji. The music for the film was composed by Sirpy and the film opened to positive reviews in November 2003, after several delays.

Cast
 Suvalakshmi as Jameela
 Rajan P. Dev as Mohammed Khan
 Ramji as Nazeer
 Cochin Haneefa
 Ajay Rathnam
 Shanti Williams
 R. C. Sakthi

Production
Ponvannan's second directorial venture, Jameela (2003), featuring Suvalakshmi, Rajan P. Dev and Ramji, told the story of an ego clash between two men which ruins the life of an obedient woman. Ponvannan had been impressed with writer Sara Aboobacker's novel and bought the script rights, before submitting his screenplay to National Film Development Corporation of India to finance the film. The agency agreed and Jameela was shot for 17 days in Pondicherry at a shoestring budget of ₹35 lakh (worth ₹2.4 crore in 2021 prices).

Release
The film won positive reviews in screenings and was well received by critics, prompting it to be selected to be shown in the non-competitive category at the 2002 Shanghai International Film Festival. Despite being censored in 2001, the film only had a theatrical release across India in November 2003 under the title Nadhi Karayinile, after the distributor Viswas Sundar did not want the film to be classified as a "Muslim film". The film did not perform well at the box office, but went on to win three State film awards including the recognition as Best Film portraying Women in Good Light. The Hindu described Ponvannan's direction as an "absorbing presentation", adding "his sensitivity comes to the fore throughout the film". This was Suvalakshmi's last film she had worked before she left the film industry.

References

Bibliography
 

2003 films
2000s Tamil-language films
Films about women in India
Indian feminist films
Indian drama films
Films about domestic violence
2003 drama films
Films based on Indian novels
Films shot in Puducherry